Roy Taylor (born 13 July 1944) is a South African former cricketer. He played in 33 first-class and 5 List A matches from 1969/70 to 1975/76.

See also
 List of Border representative cricketers

References

External links
 

1944 births
Living people
South African cricketers
Border cricketers
Eastern Province cricketers
People from Queenstown, South Africa
Cricketers from the Eastern Cape